Evidence is the fourth album by Steve Lacy and was released on the New Jazz label in 1962. It features performances of four tunes written by Thelonious Monk and two from Duke Ellington by Lacy, Don Cherry, Carl Brown and Billy Higgins.

Reception
The Allmusic review by Al Campbell awarded the album 4 stars, stating: "Soprano saxophonist Steve Lacy continued his early exploration of Thelonious Monk's compositions on this 1961 Prestige date, Evidence. Lacy worked extensively with Monk, absorbing the pianist's intricate music and adding his individualist soprano saxophone mark to it. On this date, he employs the equally impressive Don Cherry on trumpet, who was playing with the Ornette Coleman quartet at the time, drummer Billy Higgins, who played with both Coleman and Monk, and bassist Carl Brown. Cherry proved capable of playing outside the jagged lines he formulated with Coleman, being just as complimentary and exciting in Monk's arena with Lacy. Out of the six tracks, four are Monk's compositions while the remaining are lesser known Ellington numbers: 'The Mystery Song' and 'Something to Live For' (co-written with Billy Strayhorn)."

Track listing
 "The Mystery Song" (Ellington, Mills) - 5:30
 "Evidence" (Monk) - 5:00
 "Let's Cool One" (Monk) - 6:35
 "San Francisco Holiday" (Monk) - 5:15
 "Something To Live For" (Ellington, Strayhorn) - 5:50
 "Who Knows" (Monk) - 5:20

Personnel
Steve Lacy - soprano saxophone
Don Cherry - trumpet
Carl Brown - bass
Billy Higgins - drums

References 

1962 albums
Steve Lacy (saxophonist) albums
New Jazz Records albums
Albums recorded at Van Gelder Studio
Albums produced by Esmond Edwards